Svetlana Innokentyevna Sorokina (née Sarykova; born January 15, 1957, Pushkin) is a  Russian journalist, member of the , teacher at the Higher School of Economics, and a former member of the Presidential Council for Civil Society and Human Rights (2009-2011).

Career
Born 15 January 1957

In 1987, it included in the staff of the Leningrad television in 1988-1990   leading the program 600 seconds.

She worked at the All-Russia State Television and Radio Broadcasting Company, NTV, TV-6, Channel One Russia and other.

From April to December of 2015 hosted a talk show Sorokina on the Dozhd channel.

Personal life
 Single. Kept her husband's surname from the first marriage—her maiden name is Sarykova. Her second husband was a television operator Vladimir Grechishkin.
 In July 2003, she became the foster mother of daughter Tonya.

Awards
 Awarded the Order "For Personal Courage" (1993)
 A three-time winner of TEFI (1996, 2000, 2005)

References

External links
 Svetlana Sorokina's blog hosted by the Echo of Moscow 

1957 births
Living people
People from Pushkin, Saint Petersburg
Soviet journalists
Russian journalists
Russian television presenters
Soviet television presenters
Radio and television announcers
Russian women journalists
Russian women television presenters
20th-century Russian journalists
21st-century Russian journalists
20th-century Russian women
Academic staff of the Higher School of Economics
TV Rain